Rita gogra is a species of bagrid catfish endemic to India where it is found in the rivers of the Deccan Plateau up to the Krishna River system. It is an inhabitant of large rivers. It grows to a total length of 26 cm and is commercially fished for human consumption.

References 

Bagridae
Catfish of Asia
Freshwater fish of India
Endemic fauna of India
Fish described in 1839
Taxa named by William Henry Sykes